Clare Louise Tomlinson (born 6 September 1968) is a presenter for the British satellite broadcast sports network Sky Sports. She was born in Grantham, Lincolnshire.

Early life
Tomlinson was born at Barrowby in 1968. She was educated at the Kesteven and Grantham Girls' School.

Career
Tomlinson started her career in public relations, including a period as the receptionist for Max Clifford & Associates. In the early 1990s Tomlinson worked at the Football Association as a media officer. Later in the decade she was appointed as the head of the communications department at Arsenal Football Club, where she helped the then new manager Arsène Wenger with media relations.

Tomlinson joined BSkyB's UEFA Champions League coverage alongside Richard Keys. She then became touchline reporter on Sky Sports' Ford Super Sunday, and co-presented Goals On Sunday, Sky Sports' Sunday morning football highlights programme. Tomlinson was placed on leave from Goals on Sunday for two months, from October 2007.

Tomlinson is a presenter on Sky Sports News, usually on their late show Through the Night. In April 2007 she became the first woman to present the Professional Footballers' Association Awards Ceremony at the Grosvenor Hotel in London.

Personal life
Tomlinson is a fan of Tottenham Hotspur.

In 2000, it was revealed that she had a relationship with the married footballer Bryan Robson.

Tomlinson currently lives in Matlock Bath in Derbyshire.

References

External links 
 Clare Tomlinson at TV Newsroom

1968 births
Living people
People from Grantham
People educated at Kesteven and Grantham Girls' School
English television presenters
Sky Sports presenters and reporters